The White Mosque ( or Ak Mesxhid), also known as Sultan Bayezid II. Mosque, is a ruined mosque in Berat Castle, Berat, Albania. From the small, roughly square mosque there are still about a meter high foundation walls and the base of the minaret, a little over two meters high. It was built with white limestone in 1417, and was destroyed sometime in the 19th century after a local uprising against the Ottoman Empire's Tanzimat reforms.

It became a Cultural Monument of Albania in 1961, but was left untended after 1967 under Enver Hoxha's atheistic regime.

References

Ottoman architecture in Albania
Cultural Monuments of Albania
Mosques in Berat
Ruins in Albania
Mosques destroyed by communists